Joan Tozzer Cave (born September 19, 1921 in Boston, Massachusetts; died April 15, 2012 in Dedham, Massachusetts) was born to Alfred Marston (1877-1954) and Margaret (née Castle, 1886-1979) Tozzer.  She was an American figure skater who competed in single skating and pair skating. Her pairs partner was Bernard Fox. She won the United States Figure Skating Championships in both singles and pairs in 1938, 1939, and 1940. Tozzer was the U.S. novice national champion in 1934 and the junior national champion in 1937.

Her father was anthropologist Alfred Tozzer. She was inducted into the United States Figure Skating Hall of Fame in 1997.

Results

Ladies Singles

Pairs (with Fox)

References

  Joan Tozzer Cave, 1921-2012
  Joan Tozzer Cave, 90, figure skater driven to succeed
   

American female pair skaters
American female single skaters
Figure skaters from Boston
1921 births
2012 deaths
21st-century American women